Vadakkuvalliyur is a panchayat town in Tirunelveli district in the Indian state of Tamil Nadu.

Demographics
 India census, Vadakkuvalliyur had a population of 24,020. Males constitute 49% of the population and females 51%. Vadakkuvalliyur has an average literacy rate of 77%, higher than the national average of 59.5%: male literacy is 82%, and female literacy is 73%. In Vadakkuvalliyur, 11% of the population is under 6 years of age.

See also
Kizhavaneri

References

Cities and towns in Tirunelveli district